Savinskaya is a rural locality (a village) in Sibirskoye Rural Settlement, Verkhovazhsky District, Vologda Oblast, Russia. The population was 5 as of 2002.

Geography 
Savinskaya is located 47 km southeast of Verkhovazhye (the district's administrative centre) by road. Kozevskaya is the nearest rural locality.

References 

Rural localities in Verkhovazhsky District